Pepper mild tigré virus (PepMTV) is a plant pathogenic virus of the family Geminiviridae.  It was demoted from species status in 2002.

References

External links
ICTVdB - The Universal Virus Database: Pepper mild tigre virus

Begomovirus
Viral plant pathogens and diseases
Unaccepted virus taxa